Rebecca Chan Sau Chu (born October 20, 1958) is a Hong Kong actress best known for her works with the television network TVB such as hit series War and Beauty where she played the main villain. She joined TVB in 1979, when she competed at the Miss Hong Kong 1979 pageant. She finished as a top 10 semifinalist. She left TVB in 1990, rejoined in 1995 and left again in July 2020.

Filmography

Variety show (TVB)
1981: Sports World TVB
1983: Enjoy Yourself Tonight (EYT)
1989: 10 Anniversary of Guangzhou Chinese New Year Celebration

References

External link 
 

1958 births
Living people
TVB veteran actors
Hong Kong television actresses
Hong Kong film actresses
20th-century Hong Kong actresses
21st-century Hong Kong actresses
Alumni of St. Paul's Co-educational College